The Ivchenko-Progress AI-322 are a family of low-bypass turbofan engines developed from the AI-222 engine.

Design and development
The development of the engine continues at Ivchenko-Progress of Zaporizhzhia, Ukraine. The engine was originally intended for the Hongdu L-15 trainer aircraft and it is now planned to be used in Baykar Bayraktar Kızılelma fighter UAV. An afterburning version, the AI-322F is also available.

Variants
AI-322
AI-322F

Applications
 Baykar Bayraktar Kızılelma
 Hongdu L-15

Specifications (AI-322F)

See also

References

External links
Motorsich AI-322 page

AI-222
Low-bypass turbofan engines
2000s turbofan engines